Liechtenstein competed at the 1994 Winter Paralympics in Lillehammer, Norway. One competitor from Liechtenstein won a single bronze medal and finished joint 22nd in the medal table with Belgium, Czech Republic and Estonia.

See also 
 Liechtenstein at the Paralympics
 Liechtenstein at the 1994 Winter Olympics

References 

Liechtenstein at the Paralympics
1994 in Liechtenstein sport
Nations at the 1994 Winter Paralympics